Bogota is an unincorporated community in Smallwood Township, Jasper County, Illinois, United States.

References

Unincorporated communities in Illinois
Unincorporated communities in Jasper County, Illinois